481st may refer to:

481st Bombardment Squadron, inactive United States Air Force unit
481st Tactical Fighter Squadron, fighter squadron of the United States Air Force

See also
481 (number)
481, the year 481 (CDLXXXI) of the Julian calendar
481 BC